"Hey Alright" is the second and final single released from the Rottin Razkals' debut album, Rottin ta da Core. It was released on June 13, 1995, and was produced and written by Naughty by Nature. The single was the less successful of the two, making it to 23 on the Hot Rap Singles chart. The song sampled "Caravan of Love" by Isley Jasper Isley.

Single track listing

A-Side
"Hey Alright" (Radio Edit)- 3:44
"Hey Alright" (LP Version)- 3:48
"Hey Alright" (Instrumental)- 3:45
"Hey Alright" (Acapella)- 3:15

B-Side
"Lik a Shot" (Radio Edit)- 3:55
"Lik a Shot" (LP Version)- 4:11
"Lik a Shot" (Instrumental)- 3:52
"Lik a Shot" (Acapella)- 3:51

1994 songs
1995 singles
Song recordings produced by Naughty by Nature
Songs written by Treach
Songs written by KayGee
Songs written by Vin Rock
Motown singles